Panu Kuusela (born 2 April 1979) is a Finnish former professional footballer who played as a defender. He played professionally for FC Viikingit and RoPS.

References

External links
 

1979 births
Living people
Finnish footballers
Association football defenders
Rovaniemen Palloseura players
Veikkausliiga players